The 1971 Currie Cup was the 33nd edition of the Currie Cup, the premier annual domestic rugby union competition in South Africa.

Results

Semi-final

Final

See also

 Currie Cup

Notes

References

1971
1971 in South African rugby union
1971 rugby union tournaments for clubs